Juan Pío Camilo de Tristán y Moscoso (July 11, 1773, Arequipa – August 24, 1860, Lima) was a Peruvian general and politician who served as the second President of South Peru from October 12, 1838 to February 23, 1839. He was nominally the last viceroy of Peru, serving in that capacity from December 9 to December 30, 1824, but not exercising power.

Biography

Early career
Tristán was born in Arequipa to a wealthy family descended from the House of Borgia, something which he felt proud of. Later in life, Tristán y Moscoso went to Spain, where he fought the French in the War of the Convention (1793–1795). On his return to Peru he was elected alcalde (mayor) of Arequipa (1808). He was a general in the Royalist army in Peru. In June 1811 he fought as part of the victorious Royalist forces in the Battle of Guaqui.

Battle of Salta
He led a Royalist force into the territory of present-day Argentina after the Battle of Guaqui. He was defeated at Tucumán and again at Salta, by one of his classmates at Salamanca, rebel General Manuel Belgrano. The Battle of Salta took place on February20, 1813. Belgrano had been sent by the Second Triumvirate (of insurgents in Buenos Aires) to attack the city, at the northern extremity of the old Viceroyalty of Rio de la Plata. This he did, completely defeating the troops of Tristán. It was the first military victory achieved under the flag of Argentina.

After his defeat, Tristán signed a 40-day truce and returned to Peru. The defeat of the Royalists at Salta gave the insurgents domination over the northern part of the old viceroyalty and also led to revolts against the Spanish in Charcas, Potosí and, later, Cochabamba, Alto Perú (now Bolivia). At the expiration of the truce, General Belgrano followed Tristán into Alto Perú, entering the territory of Charcas on May7, 1813. However, Belgrano was defeated at Vilcapugio on November1, and again at Ayohuma on November14.

Political career
The December 1824 defeat of Viceroy José de la Serna in the Battle of Ayacucho effectively ended Spanish power in Peru. Tristán was the most senior Spanish military officer in the colony, and as such he assumed the office of provisional viceroy, solely for the purpose of transferring power to the nationalists.

After this, he chose to stay in Peru, and was active in Peruvian politics. He exercised the functions of prefect and commander in Arequipa. Then he was Peruvian minister of war and marine. He was Minister of Finance of Peru in 1836. He participated in the creation of the Peruvian-Bolivian Confederation and served as its foreign minister. From October12, 1838 to February23, 1839 he was president of the state of South Peru within the Confederation. He died in Lima in1860.

He later lived in the Tristán del Pozo House, formerly owned by some relatives, and is described, by his niece, Flora Tristan, in her travel book Pérégrinations d'une paria (Peregrinations of a Pariah, 1838). Flora Tristan was a feminist and socialist writer, and, incidentally, the maternal grandmother of French painter Paul Gauguin.

See also
 Tristán family:
Domingo Tristán
Flora Tristán
Victoria Tristán, wife of President of Peru José Rufino Echenique

References

External links
 Brief biography at Encarta
 Battle of Salta

1773 births
1860 deaths
Viceroys of Peru
Peruvian Ministers of Economy and Finance
Royalists in the Hispanic American Revolution
Peruvian people of Spanish descent
Government ministers of Peru
University of Salamanca alumni